The 2010 Giro del Trentino was the 34th edition of the Tour of the Alps cycle race and was held on 20 April to 23 April 2010. The race started in Riva del Garda and finished in Arco. The race was won by Alexander Vinokourov.

General classification

References

2010
2010 in road cycling
2010 in Italian sport